The black goby (Gobius niger) is a species of ray-finned fish found in the Eastern Atlantic and Mediterranean Sea and Black Sea. It inhabits estuaries, lagoons, and inshore water over seagrass and algae. It feeds on a variety of invertebrates and sometimes small fish. This species can also be found in the aquarium trade.

This fish reaches a maximum length of  TL. This fish's neck is scaled and both of its dorsal fins have a black spot on the front end.

Description
The black goby is deeper-bodied than the common goby, sand goby and two-spotted goby with a more rounded snout and generally a larger size. It has two dorsal fins that are almost continuous, the anterior one having six spines, which may project from the fin membrane, and the posterior and shorter one having soft rays. The posterior dorsal fin terminates close to the caudal peduncle in contrast to the common and sand gobies where there is a long gap. The pelvic fins are fused. The colour is some shade of dark brown with indistinct black blotches. The colour of the male becomes almost black during the breeding season and his fins become more vivid. The average size of this fish is about

Distribution and habitat
The black goby is native to shallow waters in the eastern Atlantic Ocean, the Mediterranean Sea and the Black Sea. Its typical habitat is lagoons, estuaries and inshore waters, on sandy or muddy bottoms and among seagrasses and seaweeds, and it occasionally moves into fresh water.

Behaviour
The black goby feeds on small invertebrates on the seabed. It breeds in the summer at which time the male creates a territory in a shallow weedy area and prepares a nest on a clean piece of seabed. He invites the female to inspect it and if she approves, she lays her eggs there and the male guards them until they hatch.

References

External links
 

black goby
Fish of the Adriatic Sea
Fish of the Mediterranean Sea
Fish of the Baltic Sea
Fish of the Black Sea
Fish of the North Sea
Marine fish of Europe
Marine fauna of North Africa
Fauna of the British Isles
black goby
black goby